John Chesley Colquitt (July 14, 1846 – May 12, 1913) was an American politician. He was a member of the Arkansas House of Representatives, serving from 1885 to 1888 and from 1893 to 1897. He was a member of the Democratic party.

He died at his home in Magnolia, Arkansas on May 12, 1913.

References

External links
 

1913 deaths
Speakers of the Arkansas House of Representatives
Democratic Party members of the Arkansas House of Representatives
1846 births
People from Columbia County, Arkansas
19th-century American politicians